Allegorical interpretations of Genesis are readings of the biblical Book of Genesis that treat elements of the narrative as symbols or types, rather than viewing them literally as recording historical events. Either way, Judaism and most sects of  Christianity treat Genesis as canonical scripture, and believers generally regard it as having spiritual significance.

The opening chapter of Genesis tells a story of God's creation of the universe and of humankind as taking place over the course of six successive days. Some Christian and Jewish schools of thought (such as Christian fundamentalism) read these biblical passages literally, assuming each day of creation as 24 hours in duration. Others (Eastern Orthodox, and mainline Protestant denominations) read the story allegorically, and hold that the biblical account aims to describe humankind's relationship to creation and the creator, that Genesis 1 does not describe actual historical events, and that the six days of creation simply represents a long period of time. The Catholic Church allows for a variety of interpretations, as long as the doctrines of creation ex nihilo, human monogenism, original sin, and the Imago Dei are maintained.

Genesis 2 records a second account of creation. Chapter 3 introduces a talking serpent, which many Christians believe is Satan in disguise. Many Christians in ancient times regarded the early chapters of Genesis as true both as history and as allegory.

Other Jews and Christians have long regarded the creation account of Genesis as an allegory - even prior to the development of modern science and the scientific accounts (based on the scientific method) of cosmological, biological and human origins. Notable proponents of allegorical interpretation include the Christian theologian Origen, who wrote in the 2nd century that it was inconceivable to consider Genesis literal history, Augustine of Hippo, who in the 4th century, on theological grounds, argued that God created everything in the universe in the same instant, and not in six days as a plain reading of Genesis would require; and the even earlier 1st-century Jewish scholar Philo of Alexandria, who wrote that it would be a mistake to think that creation happened in six days or in any determinate amount of time.

Interpretation

Church historians on allegorical interpretation of Genesis
The literalist reading of some contemporary Christians maligns the allegorical or mythical interpretation of Genesis as a belated attempt to reconcile science with the biblical account. They maintain that the story of origins had always been interpreted literally until modern science (and, specifically, biological evolution) arose and challenged it. This view is not the consensus view, however, as demonstrated below:

According to Rowan Williams: "[For] most of the history of Christianity there's been an awareness that a belief that everything depends on the creative act of God, is quite compatible with a degree of uncertainty or latitude about how precisely that unfolds in creative time."

Some religious historians consider that biblical literalism came about with the rise of Protestantism; before the Reformation, the Bible was not usually interpreted in a completely literal way. Stanley Jaki, a Benedictine priest and theologian who is also a distinguished physicist, states in his Bible and Science:

However, the Russian Orthodox hieromonk Seraphim Rose has argued that leading Orthodox saints such as Basil the Great, Gregory the Theologian, John Chrysostom and Ephraim the Syrian believed that Genesis should be treated as a historical account.

Ancient Christian interpretations

Finding allegory in history

Maxine Clarke Beach comments Paul's assertion in  that the Genesis story of Abraham's sons is an allegory, writing that "This allegorical interpretation has been one of the biblical texts used in the long history of Christian anti-Semitism, which its author could not have imagined or intended".

Other New Testament writers took a similar approach to the Jewish Bible.  The Gospel of Matthew reinterprets a number of passages. Where the prophet Hosea has God say of Israel, "Out of Egypt I called my son,", Matthew interprets the phrase as a reference to Jesus. Likewise, Isaiah's promise of a child as a sign to King Ahaz is understood by Matthew to refer to Jesus.

Later Christians followed their example. Irenaeus of Lyons, in his work Against Heresies from the middle of the 2nd century, saw the story of Adam, Eve and the serpent pointing to the death of Jesus:

In the 3rd century, Origen and others of the Alexandrian school claimed that the Bible's true meaning could be found only by reading it allegorically. Origen explained in De Principiis that sometimes spiritual teachings could be gleaned from historical events, and sometimes the lessons could only be taught through stories that, taken literally, would "seem incapable of containing truth."

Days of creation

Early Christians  seem to have been divided over whether to interpret the days of creation in Genesis 1 as literal days, or to understand them allegorically. 

For example, Basil the Great rejected an allegorical interpretation in his Hexaëmeron, without commenting on the literalism of the days:

Origen of Alexandria, in a passage that was later chosen by Gregory of Nazianzus for inclusion in the Philocalia, an anthology of some of his most important texts, made the following remarks:

In Contra Celsum, an apologetic work written in response to the pagan intellectual Celsus, Origen also said:

Augustine of Hippo, one of the most influential theologians of the Catholic Church, suggested that the Biblical text should not be interpreted literally if it contradicts what we know from science and our God-given reason. From an important passage on his The Literal Interpretation of Genesis (early fifth century, AD), Augustine wrote:

In the book, Augustine took the view that everything in the universe was created simultaneously by God, and not in seven days like a plain account of Genesis would require. He argues that the six-day structure of creation presented in the book of Genesis represents a logical framework, rather than the passage of time in a physical way. Augustine also does not envisage original sin as originating structural changes in the universe, and even suggests that the bodies of Adam and Eve were already created mortal before the Fall. Apart from his specific views, Augustine recognizes that the interpretation of the creation story is difficult, and remarks that we should be willing to change our mind about it as new information comes up.

In The City of God, Augustine rejected both the immortality of the human race proposed by pagans, and contemporary ideas of ages (such as those of certain Greeks and Egyptians) that differed from the church's sacred writings:

However, Augustine is quoting here about the age of human civilization not the age of the Earth based on his use of early Christian histories. Those histories are no longer considered accurate  in terms of exact years and therefore either the 6000 years is not an exact number or the years aren't actual literal years.

Augustine also comments on the word "day" in the creation week, admitting the interpretation is difficult:

Contemporary Christian considerations

Many modern Christian theologians, Roman Catholic, Eastern Orthodox, and mainline Protestants, have rejected literalistic interpretations of Genesis in favour of allegorical or mythopoietic interpretations such as the literary framework view. Many Christian Fundamentalists have considered such rejection unmerited. Sir Robert Anderson wrote, "Christ and Criticism" in The Fundamentals, which wholly rejected a non-literal interpretation of Genesis by Jesus Christ. In modern times, Answers in Genesis has been a strong advocate of a literal interpretation of Genesis.

Catholic theologian Ludwig Ott in his authoritative Fundamentals of Catholic Dogma, under the section "The Divine Work of Creation," (pages 92–122) covers the "biblical hexahemeron" (the "six days" of creation), the creation of man, Adam/Eve, original sin, the Fall, and the statements of the early Fathers, saints, church councils, and popes relevant to the matter. Ott makes the following comments on the "science" of Genesis and the Fathers:

Pope John Paul II wrote to the Pontifical Academy of Sciences on the subject of cosmology and how to interpret Genesis:

The "Clergy Letter" Project, drafted in 2004, and signed by thousands of Christian clergy supporting science and faith, states:

Prominent evangelical advocates of metaphorical interpretations of Genesis include Meredith G. Kline and Henri Blocher who advocate the literary framework view. In Beyond the Firmament: Understanding Science and the Theology of Creation, evangelical author Gordon J. Glover argues for an ancient near-eastern cosmology interpretation of Genesis, which he labels the theology of creation:

Rabbinic teachings

Philo was the first commentator to use allegory on Bible extensively in his writing.

Some medieval philosophical rationalists, such as Maimonides (Mosheh ben Maimon, the "Rambam") held that it was not required to read Genesis literally. In this view, one was obligated to understand Torah in a way that was compatible with the findings of science. Indeed, Maimonides, one of the great rabbis of the Middle Ages, wrote that if science and Torah were misaligned, it was either because science was not understood or the Torah was misinterpreted. Maimonides argued that if science proved a point, then the finding should be accepted and scripture should be interpreted accordingly. Before him Saadia Gaon set rules in the same spirit when allegoric approach can be used, for example, if the plain sense contradicts logic. Solomon ibn Gabirol extensively used allegory in his book "Fountain of Life", cited by Abraham ibn Ezra. In 1305 Shlomo ben Aderet wrote a letter against unrestricted usage of allegory by followers of Maimonides, like Jacob Anatoli in his book "Malmad ha-Talmidim". In spite of this Gersonides copied Maimonides' explanation the story of Adam into his commentary on Genesis, thinly veiled by extensive usage of the word "hint". The main point of Maimonides and Gersonides is that  Fall of Man is not a story about one man, but about the human nature. Adam is the pure intellect, Eve is a body, and the Serpent is a fantasy that tries to trap intellect through the body.

Zohar states:

Nahmanides, often critical of the rationalist views of Maimonides, pointed out (in his commentary to Genesis) several non-sequiturs stemming from a literal translation of the Bible's account of Creation, and stated that the account actually symbolically refers to spiritual concepts. He quoted the Mishnah in Tractate Chagigah which states that the actual meaning of the Creation account, mystical in nature, was traditionally transmitted from teachers to advanced scholars in a private setting. Many Kabbalistic sources mention Shmitot - cosmic cycles of creation, similar to the Indian concept of yugas.

Adam and Eve in the Baháʼí Faith
The Baháʼí Faith adheres to an allegorical interpretation of the Adam and Eve narrative. In Some Answered Questions, 'Abdu'l-Bahá unequivocally rejects a literal reading, instead holding that the story is a symbolic one containing "divine mysteries and universal meanings"; namely, the fall of Adam symbolizes that humanity became conscious of good and evil.

See also
 Biblical cosmology
 Evolution and the Catholic Church
 Genesis creation narrative
 Rejection of evolution by religious groups
 Anastasius Sinaita
 The Challenge of Creation
 Theistic evolution

References

External links
The Contemporary Relevance of Augustine's View of Creation
Early Church Fathers vs. Young Earth Creationism
Four Senses of Scripture includes background on the history of non-literal interpretation

Christian creationism
Jewish creationism
Biblical criticism
Evolution and religion
Book of Genesis
Bible-related controversies